COA or CoA may refer to:

Organizations
 Andorran Olympic Committee (Catalan: Comitè Olímpic Andorrà)
 Argentine Olympic Committee (Spanish: Comité Olímpico Argentino)
 Aruban Olympic Committee (Papiamento: Comité Olímpico Arubano)
 Canadian Osteopathic Association, a professional association of osteopathic physicians in Canada
 Chicago Options Associates, an American company that specializes in trading options and futures contracts
 Clowns of America International, an American organization that represents clowns
 Council on Accreditation wwww.COANet.org
 Council of Agriculture, agriculture-related institution in Taiwan
 Council of Architecture, an Indian governmental organization that registers architects in the country
 Community Oncology Alliance, an American non-profit that advocates for independent, community oncology providers and patients.
 Continental Airlines, by ICAO airline code
 Customs Officers' Association of New Zealand, a trade union
 COA Ontario, an association representing condominium owners in Canada 
 Commission on Audit (Philippines), government agency
 Commission on audit, another name for supreme audit institutions

Colleges
 College of Alameda, a college in Alameda, California
 College of The Albemarle, a college in Elizabeth City, North Carolina, US
 College of the Atlantic, a college in Bar Harbor, Maine, US

Law and business
 Certificate of authenticity, a document demonstrating that an item is as claimed
 Chart of accounts, a categorized list of accounts used by a business
 Charter Ownership Agreement, the right to purchase season tickets to a particular seat at a stadium
 Court of Appeal (England and Wales), a court that reviews the decisions reached by lower courts

Science, medicine and technology
 Care-of address, a temporary IP address assigned to a mobile internet device
 Certificate of analysis, a document certifying the identification and purity of a chemical a drug; see Drug reference standard
 Certified Ophthalmic Assistant, entry level assistant as certified by Joint Commission on Allied Health Personnel in Ophthalmology (IJCAHPO) 
 Change of Authorization, a designation for RADIUS codes
 Ciphertext-only attack, where an attacker only has encrypted data to use in deciphering text
 Collaboration-oriented architecture, a type of computer system designed to help companies work with outside organizations
 Coarctation of the aorta, a congenital condition whereby a section of the aorta is narrowed
 Coenzyme A, a coenzyme used in processing fatty acids and citric acid

Other uses
 Certificate of Authorization, used within the Federal Aviation Administration
 Coahuila, (ISO 3166 code MX-COA), a state in Mexico
 Coat of Arms, a unique heraldic design used to cover armor and identify its wearer
 Community Organization Award (COA), Boy Scouts of America
 Course of Action, in the Military Decision Making Process

See also
 Coa (disambiguation)